Arthur Eyton-Jones may refer to:

 John Eyton-Jones (1862–1940), Welsh international footballer
 David Eyton-Jones (1923–2012), British Special Air Service soldier during World War II